This is a list of people who have served as the president of Pacific Union College (PUC), a private liberal arts college in California's Napa Valley. Twenty-four individuals have done so since the college's its founding in 1882 as Healdsburg Academy.

The first eight presidents led the school while it was still located in Healdsburg. The last of these was Lucas Reed, whose tenure ended in 1908, one year before the school moved to Angwin. 

Charles Walter Irwin became the first person to be selected as president of Pacific Union College on its Angwin campus, where the college moved in 1909. Irwin led the school at its new location for thirteen years. 

The president who has served the longest tenure to date is Malcolm Maxwell, who served eighteen years. He was also the first alumnus of Pacific Union College to be selected as its president, and the fourth president to have come to PUC from Walla Walla University.

List of presidents

References

Pacific Union College
Pacific Union College
Pacific Union College, Presidents